The 1960 U.S. Open was the 60th U.S. Open, held June 16–18 at Cherry Hills Country Club in Cherry Hills Village, Colorado, a suburb of Denver. Arnold Palmer staged the greatest comeback in U.S. Open history, erasing a seven-stroke deficit during the final round to win his only U.S. Open title. It is remembered as a crossroads for the three primary contenders in the final round: Palmer, Ben Hogan, and amateur Jack Nicklaus, three of the greatest players in the history of golf.

Having already won the Masters, Palmer was half-way to the single-season Grand Slam with his win at Cherry Hills. His quest ended three weeks later at the British Open, when he lost to Kel Nagle by one stroke at St Andrews. Two weeks later, he finished five strokes back in a tie for seventh at the PGA Championship, the only major that eluded him for his career. This was Palmer's only victory at the U.S. Open; he finished second four times, including three losses in playoffs in 1962, 1963, and 1966.

This was the third major championship at Cherry Hills, which previously hosted the U.S. Open in 1938 and the PGA Championship in 1941. The U.S. Open returned in 1978 and the PGA Championship in 1985.

Course layout

Source:

Lengths of the course for previous major championships:
, par 71 - 1941 PGA Championship
, par 71 - 1938 U.S. Open

Past champions in the field

Made the cut

Missed the cut

Round summaries

First round
Thursday, June 16, 1960

Second round
Friday, June 17, 1960

Amateurs: Cherry (-1), Nicklaus (E), Beman (+6), Fowler (+6), Courtney (+7), Coody (+8), Kocsis (+8), Carmichael (+9), Chapman (+11), Schmidt (+12), Wright (+12), Donohue (+13), Weber (+13), English (+14), Konsek (+14), Moore (+15), Welauffer (+15), Gardner (+16), Rose (+17), Eisinger Jr (+19), Hane (+20).

Third round
Saturday, June 18, 1960 - (morning)

Final round
Saturday, June 18, 1960 - (afternoon)

Palmer trailed leader Mike Souchak by eight strokes after 36 holes, and by seven shots after 54 holes. Almost everyone believed he was out of contention beginning the final round, tied for fifteenth place. After nearly making an eagle at 3 and tapping in for another birdie, he holed an 18-footer for birdie at 4 then made two more birdies at 6 and 7. He cooled off the rest of his round, finally carding a 65 (−6) for a 280 (−4) total.

Twenty-year-old Jack Nicklaus, the reigning U.S. Amateur champion playing in his fourth Open, was also in contention during the final round, briefly holding the lead after making eagle at 5 and birdie at 9. Two three-putts on the back-nine dropped him to a 282 (−2) total, two strokes behind Palmer. His second-place finish was the best showing by an amateur at the U.S. Open since Johnny Goodman won in 1933. Aiming for a record fifth U.S. Open title at age 47, Ben Hogan was tied for the lead on the 71st tee, a par 5. On his third shot he hit a wedge on to the green but it spun back all the way off the green into the confines of the water hazard fronting the green and made bogey. Needing birdie to tie on 18, he again found water, triple-bogeyed, and finished in a tie for ninth place. Souchak shot a final round 75 on his way to a tie for third.

(a) denotes amateur

Source:

Scorecard
Arnold Palmer's final round 65 (−6)

{|class="wikitable" span = 50 style="font-size:85%;
|-
|style="background: Pink;" width=10|
|Birdie
|style="background: PaleGreen;" width=10|
|Bogey
|}
Source:

References

External links
USGA Championship Database
Cherry Hills Country Club

U.S. Open (golf)
Golf in Colorado
Sports competitions in Denver
Englewood, Colorado
U.S. Open
U.S. Open (golf)
U.S. Open golf
U.S. Open golf
1960s in Denver